Deborah Butler Dixon (born February 22, 1961) is an American politician who served in the Mississippi House of Representatives from the 63rd district from 2012 to 2020. Dixon lost reelection to political newcomer Stephanie Foster in the 2019 general legislature election.

References

1961 births
Living people
Democratic Party members of the Mississippi House of Representatives
People from Bolton, Mississippi
21st-century American women politicians
Women state legislators in Mississippi
Hinds Community College alumni
21st-century American politicians